Josh Woodrum (born November 7, 1992) is a former American football quarterback. He played college football at Liberty University and signed with the New York Giants as an undrafted free agent in 2016.

Early years
Woodrum attended Cave Spring High School in Roanoke, Virginia. A 2-star recruit, Woodrum
committed to play college football at Liberty over offers from Elon and Wake Forest.

College career
After redshirting as a freshman in 2011, Woodrum became the starting quarterback for the Liberty Flames football team, a position that he would remain in for the next four years. Woodrum led the Flames to three consecutive Big South Conference football championships from 2012–2014, including an appearance in the FCS playoffs in 2014. After completing his senior season in 2015, Woodrum began preparing for the National Football League Draft. In preparation for the draft, Woodrum was invited to and played in the 2016 NFLPA Collegiate Bowl. Along with North Dakota State's Carson Wentz, Woodrum was one of only two Football Championship Subdivision quarterbacks to receive an invitation to participate in the 2016 NFL Scouting Combine in Indianapolis.

Professional career

New York Giants
Following the 2016 NFL Draft, Woodrum signed as an undrafted free agent with the New York Giants. Following the Giants' rookie minicamp, the Giants released Woodrum after just three days in New York.

Indianapolis Colts
After being waived by the Giants, Woodrum was claimed off waivers by the Indianapolis Colts. On July 19, 2016, the Colts waived Woodrum.

Chicago Bears
On November 15, 2016, Woodrum was signed to the Chicago Bears practice squad. On December 5, 2016, the Bears released Woodrum.

Buffalo Bills
On January 2, 2017, Woodrum signed a reserve/future contract with the Buffalo Bills. He was waived by the Bills on May 24, 2017.

Baltimore Ravens
On July 31, 2017, Woodrum signed with the Baltimore Ravens. He saw his first preseason action with the Ravens, where he took full advantage of the opportunity. He finished the preseason going 25 of 36 for 321 passing yards and 4 total touchdowns. He was waived on September 2, 2017.

Cleveland Browns
On September 3, 2017, Woodrum was claimed off waivers by the Cleveland Browns. Woodrum was released by the Browns on September 7, 2017.

Baltimore Ravens (second stint)
On September 12, 2017, Woodrum was re-signed to the Ravens' practice squad. He signed a reserve/future contract with the Ravens on January 1, 2018.

On September 1, 2018, Woodrum was waived by the Ravens.

Salt Lake Stallions
On November 27, 2018, Woodrum was selected by the Salt Lake Stallions with the eighth-overall pick in the Alliance of American Football's quarterback draft. He eventually started the Stallions' season opener against the Arizona Hotshots, where he threw for 103 yards, 1 TD, and 1 INT before leaving the game in the second half with a hamstring injury.

Washington Redskins
After the AAF suspended operations, Woodrum signed with the Washington Redskins on April 18, 2019. He tore his pectoral on August 8 in a preseason game against the Browns and was placed on injured reserve.

Woodrum became a free agent on March 18, 2020, after the Redskins chose not to tender him as an exclusive-rights free agent following the 2019 season.

AAF statistics

References

External links
Liberty Flames bio
Chicago Bears bio
Buffalo Bills bio

1992 births
Living people
Sportspeople from Roanoke, Virginia
Players of American football from Virginia
American football quarterbacks
Liberty Flames football players
New York Giants players
Indianapolis Colts players
Chicago Bears players
Buffalo Bills players
Baltimore Ravens players
Cleveland Browns players
Salt Lake Stallions players
Washington Redskins players